The Arsenal Émouchet (English: Kestrel), more commonly known as Sports Aériens Émouchet, Air Émouchet, or Guerchais-Roche Émouchet, is a modest performance, single-seat training glider designed and first produced in France during World War II.  Quantity production continued post-war, when it played an important part in re-equipping the French glider movement through its clubs.

Design and development
The Émouchet was designed and built by Arsenal de l'Aeronautique during World War II.  It is an all wood and fabric, single seat, open cockpit training and club glider influenced, like many others, by the Grunau Baby but distinct from it. The single spar wings, wooden structures with fabric covering, have a parallel chord centre section and tapered outer panels with rounded tips.  The trailing edges of these outer panels are occupied with ailerons.  There are no flaps or spoilers on the initial SA 103 model, but the later Arsenal SA 104 has mid-chord spoilers at the outer end of the centre section.

As on the Grunau Baby, the wing is high or parasol mounted, raised above the fuselage on a pedestal which rapidly drops away behind the trailing edge. It is braced to the lower fuselage with a short single steel strut on each side. The Émouchet's open cockpit is at the front of the pedestal, just ahead of the wing leading edge.  Its hexagonal cross section fuselage is entirely plywood covered.  The fabric covered rear surfaces are markedly different from those of the Baby, with the horizontal stabiliser raised above the fuselage on a shallow step well forward of the narrow fin and with control surfaces which are rounded; the rudder in particular is curved and broad.
The SA 103 lands on a single forward skid and tail bumper but a monowheel was added to the SA 104.

Operational history
The SA 103 Émouchet was selected for quantity production under the Vichy government, with about 200 built. Post war, the French government included it in a list of four production glider types as the basic single-seat trainer, flown after introductionary tuition in the two seat Caudron C.800. Ateliers Roche Aviation (Guerchais-Roche) built 150 SA 103 and 100 SA 104. Ets Victor Minie were another company which built Émouchets, producing 27 SA 104s. They were also involved in a collaboration with SNECMA which involved fitting four of the latter's Escopette 3340 pulse jets under the wings of an Émouchet in pairs of long housings mounted well clear under each wing on a pair of thin struts. This aircraft flew for the first time on 30 November 1950. By the following June a second aircraft was flying with six of these engines. Later, the more powerful Tremblon pulse-jet was fitted.

Three remained on the French civil register in 2010.

Variants

SA 103 Original design, first flown and produced during World War II, production continued post-war. At least 350 built.

SA 104 First flown around 1950; it is heavier with spoilers and a monowheel undercarriage.  At least150 built.

Minié Emouchet Escopette One off modification by Société Minié Aéronautiques with initially four, later six, underwing SNECMA Escopette pulse-jets, later replaced with Tremblon pulse-jets. First flown 30 November 1950.

SA 103 prone pilot An SA 103 was modified with a prone pilot position for research purposes.

Specifications (SA 104)

See also

Notes

References

External links

1940s French sailplanes
Emouchet
Prone pilot aircraft
Glider aircraft
Aircraft first flown in 1942